Kalasangham Films is an Indian film production and distribution company based in the Malayalam film industry. It was founded by M. M. Hamsa. It has since gone on to distribute several films in Malayalam and other regional Indian languages.

Productions

Distributions

References 

Indian film producers
Mass media companies established in 2001
Indian film distributors